The MPK-105 was a  in the Soviet Navy and later Russian Navy.

Specifications 

Developed in the GDR by specialists from the Zelenodolsk shipyard, Captain 2nd Rank O.K. Korobkov was appointed the main observer from the Navy on the project. For the GDR Navy, 16 ships were built (in Germany, Project 133.1, Parchim), the head MPK entered service in 1981. In 1992, all ships of the Project 133.1 were sold to Indonesia. For the USSR Navy, they were built according to the 1331M Project, after the collapse of the USSR, all ships were transferred to the Russian Navy. The modernized version was distinguished by updated artillery, hydroacoustic and radio-technical weapons.

Project 133.1 was developed on the basis of the IPC Project 1124 Albatross in the German Democratic Republic (GDR) with the help of specialists from the Zelenodolsk shipyard for the Navy of the National People's Army of the GDR and the Warsaw Pact countries, as well as for export sales.

Project 1331M was designed in the German Democratic Republic with the technical assistance of the Zelenodolsk Design Bureau for the USSR Navy, this project is a development of Project 133.1 and differs from it in the composition of weapons and navigation equipment.

Construction and career 
MPK-105 was laid down on 30 December 1985 at Peene-Werft, Wolgast. Launched on 20 November 1986 and commissioned on 16 March 1988 into the Baltic Fleet.

In 1990, 1992 and 1993, as part of the KPUG, he became the owner of the Navy Commander's Prize for anti-submarine warfare.

The ship was decommissioned in 2014 and was moored at Kaliningrad to await her fate.

The ship was seen abandoned and partially sunk as of 2018, at his moorings. Recent satellite imagery shows that the ship was no longer at her moorings, presumed scrapped.

Pennant numbers

Citations 

Ships built in East Germany
1986 ships
Parchim-class corvettes